The Siguacán River is a river of Guatemala.

See also
List of rivers of Guatemala

References

Rand McNally, The New International Atlas, 1993.

Rivers of Guatemala